Lucas Guimaraes Poli (born 11 November 1990) is a Brazilian footballer who currently plays as a midfielder for Pütürge Belediyespor.

Career statistics

Club

Notes

References

1990 births
Living people
Brazilian footballers
Brazilian expatriate footballers
Association football midfielders
Operário Ferroviário Esporte Clube players
Ipatinga Futebol Clube players
Esporte Clube Tigres do Brasil players
Expatriate footballers in Northern Cyprus
Footballers from Rio de Janeiro (city)